Saint-Guyomard is a commune in the Morbihan department of Brittany in north-western France.

Demographics
Inhabitants of Saint-Guyomard are called in French Guyomardais. The official population in 2019 was 1,389.

See also
Communes of the Morbihan department

References

External links

 Mayors of Morbihan Association 

Saintguyomard